The Patten Colony Farm is a historic farm property in Palmer, Alaska.  It is located near milepost 39.9 on the Glenn Highway, and is a relatively complete instance of a farmstead established in the 1930s as part of the Matanuska Valley Colony initiative.  The complex consists of eight buildings, six of which were built in the 1930s.  The main house is an L-shaped log structure with a concrete foundation, a rarity in the colony.  Smaller outbuildings include a log outhouse, a chicken house, and two barns, one of which is the only surviving horse barn (out of two built) of the colony.

The property was listed on the National Register of Historic Places in 1991.

See also
National Register of Historic Places listings in Matanuska-Susitna Borough, Alaska

References

Farms on the National Register of Historic Places in Alaska
Buildings and structures completed in 1940
Buildings and structures in Matanuska-Susitna Borough, Alaska
Historic districts on the National Register of Historic Places in Alaska
Buildings and structures on the National Register of Historic Places in Matanuska-Susitna Borough, Alaska